The Farmer's Daughter is a 1962 American TV film starring Peter Lawford and Lee Remick.

Cast
Peter Lawford as Glen Morley
Lee Remick as Katrin Holstrom
Charles Bickford as Clancy
Cornelia Otis Skinner as Mrs Morley
Jerome Cowan as Finley
Milton Selzer as Adolph
Murray Hamilton as Nordick
Thomas Chalmers as Johnson

Production
The film was a remake of the 1947 film. Peter Lawford was brother-in-law of President John F. Kennedy at the time.

References

External links
The Farmer's Daughter at IMDb
The Farmer's Daughter at TCMDB
The Farmer's Daughter at BFI

1962 television films
1962 films